Jessa Crispin (born c. 1978 in Lincoln, Kansas) is a critic, author, feminist, and the editor-in-chief of Bookslut, a litblog and webzine founded in 2002. She has published three books, most recently Why I Am Not A Feminist: A Feminist Manifesto (2017).

Early life
Crispin is from Lincoln, Kansas; she has described both her hometown and upbringing in her family as very conservative. She attended Baker University in Kansas for two years before leaving without a degree.

Literary career
Crispin began her literary career as publishing outsider who started her blog Bookslut on the side while working at Planned Parenthood in Austin, Texas. She eventually came to support herself by writing and editing the site full-time. Bookslut ran for 14 years, with the last issue announced in May 2016. Bookslut received mentions in many national and international newspapers, including The New York Times Book Review and The Washington Post.

In 2005 Crispin kept a diary about her work on books for The Guardian. Crispin had a regular column in the online cultural journal The Smart Set, published by Drexel University. She was a book critic for NPR and contributor to PBS's Need to Know. She has written for the New York Times, the Washington Post, Chicago Sun-Times and The Globe and Mail, among other publications. She wrote the afterword to Melville House Books' reissue of Heinrich Böll's Billiards at Half-Past Nine.

Personal life
In 2018, Crispin married Nicolás Rodríguez Melo, partly in order to sponsor his visa, and interviewed him for her Public Intellectual podcast about the performance of masculinity and femininity. She has criticized married women in the past: "Marriage’s history is about treating women as property, and by being married you’re legitimising that history."

Works
The Dead Ladies Project: Exiles, Expats, and Ex-Countries (Chicago: The University of Chicago Press, 2015)  
The Creative Tarot: A Modern Guide to an Inspired Life (New York: Simon and Schuster, 2016)
Why I Am Not a Feminist: A Feminist Manifesto (New York: Melville House, 2017)
My Three Dads: Patriarchy on the Great Plains (University of Chicago Press, 2022)

References

External links 

 Bookslut Official site (archived)
 An excerpt from The Dead Ladies Project

Year of birth missing (living people)
Living people
1970s births
American women bloggers
American bloggers
American expatriates in Germany
American feminist writers
American literary critics
Women literary critics
People from Lincoln Center, Kansas
21st-century American women writers
American women non-fiction writers
21st-century American non-fiction writers
American women critics